Now or Never is the second extended play (EP) by English musical duo Bananarama. It was released independently on 21 September 2012 to coincide with the 30th anniversary of the group and the launch of their Hard Rock Cafe "Pinktober" US tour.

The EP features "Now or Never" and "La La Love", two new recordings written in collaboration with British producer Ian Masterson. An extended version of the title track and a cover of Maroon 5's song "Moves Like Jagger" were also included in the package.

A remixed version of their 1992 song "Movin' On" was offered as a gift to fans who bought the EP and sent their proofs of purchase to the official website before 20 October 2012.

Track listing

Charts

Release history

References

2012 EPs
Bananarama EPs
Self-released EPs